Houcun may refer to:

 Houcun, Quzhou County (侯村镇), town in southern Hebei, China
 Houcun, Rizhao (后村镇), town in Lanshan District, Rizhao, Shandong, China